James John Wallis (12 November 1941 – 27 May 2022) was an Australian rules footballer who played with St Kilda in the Victorian Football League (VFL).

Notes

External links 

1941 births
2022 deaths
Australian rules footballers from Victoria (Australia)
St Kilda Football Club players